Mount Voma is the third highest mountain in Fiji. It is situated on the main island of Viti Levu and is part of the dividing range running from north to south of the island. Its height is 3,950 feet or 1204 meters,.

External links 
 Peakbagger.com

Voma
Viti Levu